Weissella bombi is a bacterium from the genus of Weissella which has been isolated from the gut of the bumblebee Bombus terrestris from Ghent in Belgium.

References

 

Bacteria described in 2015
Weissella